Progress MS-07, identified by NASA as Progress 68P, was a Progress spaceflight, operated by Roscosmos to resupply the International Space Station (ISS).

History 
The Progress-MS is an uncrewed freighter based on the Progress-M featuring improved avionics.  This improved variant first launched on 21 December 2015. It has the following improvements:

 New external compartment that enables it to deploy satellites. Each compartment can hold up to four launch containers. First time installed on Progress MS-03.
 Enhanced redundancy thanks to the addition of a backup system of electrical motors for the docking and sealing mechanism.
 Improved Micrometeoroid (MMOD) protection with additional panels in the cargo compartment.
 Luch Russian relay satellites link capabilities enable telemetry and control even when not in direct view of ground radio stations.
 GNSS autonomous navigation enables real time determination of the status vector and orbital parameters dispensing with the need of ground station orbit determination.
 Real time relative navigation thanks to direct radio data exchange capabilities with the space station.
 New digital radio that enables enhanced TV camera view for the docking operations.
 The Ukrainian Chezara Kvant-V on board radio system and antenna/feeder system has been replaced with a Unified Command Telemetry System (UCTS).
 Replacement of the Kurs A with Kurs NA digital system.

Launch 
After a two-day delay, the Progress MS-07 lifted off on 14 October 2017, at 08:46:53 UTC. The spacecraft docked at the station on 16 October 2017, at 11:04:07 UTC. Progress MS-07 was launched from the Baikonur Cosmodrome in Kazakhstan, atop a Soyuz-2.1a rocket.

Docking 
Progress MS-07 was docked with the aft docking port of the Pirs module. This Progress flight was intended to mark the debut of the new two-orbit rendezvous profile which was not possible when the original launch date had to be scrubbed.

Cargo 
The Progress MS-07 spacecraft delivered 2,549 kg of cargo and supplies to the International Space Station for the six-person crew.
The following is a breakdown of cargo bound for the ISS:

 Dry cargo: 1,382 kg
 Fuel: 700 kg (for Zvezda service module)
 Oxygen: 23 kg
 Air: 24 kg
 Water: 420 kg

Spacewalk 
Once the Progress arrived at the station, Expedition 53 commander Randolph Bresnik and flight engineer Joseph M. Acaba prepared for a spacewalk, on 20 October 2017, to accomplish a variety of maintenance tasks outside the complex. This included the replacement of a fuse on the station's Canadian-built Dextre robot, replacing an external camera and light fixture, and removing thermal insulation from two spare units to prepare them for future relocation.

Undocking and decay 
Progress MS-07 undocked from the Pirs on 28 March 2018, at 13:50:30 UTC. The vehicle continued with experiments until 26 April 2018.

References 

Progress (spacecraft) missions
Spacecraft launched in 2017
2017 in Russia
Supply vehicles for the International Space Station
Spacecraft launched by Soyuz-2 rockets
Spacecraft which reentered in 2018